Spatial justice links social justice to space, most notably in the works of geographers David Harvey and Edward W. Soja. The field analyzes the impact of regional planning and urban planning decisions. It is promoted by the scholarly tradition of critical geography, which arose in the 1970s.

Between issues of redistribution and decision-making processes 
Building on the work of several famous Justice philosophers (John Rawls, 1971; Iris Marion Young, 1990, 2000), two contrasting approaches of justice have polarized the debate: one focuses on redistribution issues, the other concentrates on decision-making processes.

A first set of approaches consists in asking questions about spatial or socio-spatial distributions and working to achieve an equal geographical distribution of society's wants and needs, such as job opportunities, access to health care, good air quality, et cetera.  This is of particular concern in regions where the population has difficulty moving to a more spatially just location due to poverty, discrimination, or political restrictions (such as apartheid pass laws).  Even in free, developed nations, access to many places are limited.  Geographer Don Mitchell points to the mass privatization of once-public land as a common example of spatial injustice. In this distributive justice perspective, the access to material and immaterial goods, or to social positions indicates whether the situation is fair or not. At the scale of urban space, questions of accessibility, walkability and transport equity can also be seen as matters of distribution of spatial resources.

Another way of tackling the concept of spatial justice is to focus on decision-making procedures: this approach also raises issues of representations of space, of territorial or other identities and of social practices. For instance, focusing on minorities allows to explore their spatial practices but also to investigate how these are experienced and managed by various agents: this may lead to reveal forms of oppression or discrimination that a universalist approach might disregard otherwise. Architect and urbanist Liz Ogbu argues, for instance, that successful spatial justice planning requires designers to "engage people who don’t have a seat at the table and think about them as co-designers in the process".

Environmental justice 
Environmental justice is a related concept, arising in the 1970s in North American cities. It criticizes the concentration of pollution and natural hazards disproportionately in minority neighborhoods, which is seen by proponents as a form of racial discrimination.

See also 

 Hermann Knoflacher

References

Bibliography 

BRAWLEY Lisa, «The Practice of Spatial Justice in Crisis», justice spatiale - spatial justice, n° 01, september 2009 
BRET Bernard, «Rawlsian universalism confronted with the diversity of reality», justice spatiale - spatial justice, n° 01, september 2009
Coll., « Justice spatiale », Annales de Géographie, n°665–666, jan–avril 2009.
Coll., "Spatial Justice", Critical Planning, Volume 14 Summer 2007.
DIKEÇ Mustafa, «Space, politics and (in)justice», justice spatiale - spatial justice, n° 01, september 2009
FAINSTEIN Susan S., «Spatial Justice and Planning», justice spatiale - spatial justice, n° 01, september 2009
 FIEDLER, Johannes; HUMANN, Melanie and KÖLKE, Manuela (2012): "Radical Standard for the Implementation of Spatial Justice in Urban Planning and Design"; published by the Center for Gender Studies of TU Braunschweig
HARVEY David, 1973, Social Justice and the City, London, Edward Arnold.
HARVEY David, 1992, "Social justice, Postmodernism and the City", International Journal of Urban and Regional Research, 16, 4, pp. 588–601.
LEFEBVRE Henri, 1968, Le Droit à la ville, Paris, Anthropos.
LEFEBVRE Henri, 1972, Espace et politique, Paris, Anthropos.
MARCUSE Peter, «Spatial Justice: Derivative but Causal of Social Injustice», justice spatiale - spatial justice, n° 01, september 2009
PIRIE Gordon, 1983, "On Spatial Justice", Environment and planning, A 15, pp. 465–473.
RAWLS John, 1971, A Theory of Justice, Cambridge, Harvard University Press.
REYNAUD Alain, 1981, Société, espace et justice, Paris, PUF.
SMITH D. M., 1994, Geography and Social Justice, Oxford, Blackwell.
SOJA Edward W., «The city and spatial justice», justice spatiale - spatial justice, n° 01, september 2009
SOJA Edward W., 2000, Postmetropolis, Critical Studies of Cities and Regions, Oxford, Blackwell.
SOJA Edward W., 2010, Seeking Spatial Justice, Minneapolis, University of Minnesota Press.
YOUNG Iris Marion, 1990, Justice and the Politics of Difference, Princeton, Princeton University Press.
YOUNG Iris Marion, 2000, Inclusion and Democracy, Oxford, Oxford University Press.

External links
What Makes Justice Spatial? What Makes Spaces Just? / Three Interviews on the Concept of Spatial Justice 
Critical Planning, UCLA Urban Planning Journal, Volume 14: Spatial Justice Summer 2007
justice spatiale - spatial justice, a new journal, published in English and in French, by the University of Paris-Ouest Nanterre, France 

Spatial Justice Test for the US using race and income data 

Justice
Political philosophy
Human sciences
Urban planning
Geography
Social justice